Mitar (Cyrillic: Митар) is a masculine given name. It is a Serbian variant of a Greek name Demetrius. Notable people with the name include:

Mitar Lukić (born 1957), former Bosnian Serb footballer and current manager of FK Sloga Doboj
Mitar Markez (born 1990 in Sombor), Serbian handballer
Mitar Mirić (born 1957), Serbian and former Yugoslav pop-folk singer
Mitar Mrdić (born 1984), Bosnian judoka
Mitar Mrkela (born 1965), retired Serbian football player, member of an Olympic medallist team in 1984
Mitar Novaković (born 1981), Montenegrin professional footballer
Mitar Pejović (born 1983), Serbian football goalkeeper
Mitar Peković (born 1981), Serbian professional footballer
Mitar Subotić (1961–1999), known as Rex Ilusivii, Serbian-born musician and composer, producer in Brazil
Mitar Vasiljević (born 1954), Bosnian Serb war criminal convicted by the International Criminal Tribunal for the Former Yugoslavia

See also
Mitrović
Mitrovica (disambiguation)
Mitrovac (disambiguation)
Kitab al-Rawd al-Mitar, The Book of the Fragrant Garden, is a fifteenth-century Arabic geography by Muhammad bin Abd al-Munim al-Himyari
Mita (disambiguation)
Mkhitar

Serbian masculine given names